Anthony Ashley-Cooper, 9th Earl of Shaftesbury  (31 August 1869 – 25 March 1961), was the son of the 8th Earl of Shaftesbury and Lady Harriet Augusta Anna Seymourina Chichester (1836 – 14 April 1898), the daughter of the 3rd Marquess of Donegall and Lady Harriet Anne Butler.

Military career
Lord Shaftesbury was commissioned a second lieutenant in the 10th Hussars in 1890, promoted to lieutenant in 1891, and to captain in 1898. From 1895-1899 he served as an Aide-de-camp to the Governor of Victoria. He retired from the regular army in 1899, but continued as a captain of the reserve in the Dorset Imperial Yeomanry. On 12 March 1902 he was promoted to lieutenant-colonel commanding the North of Ireland Imperial Yeomanry. On 1 January 1913 he was promoted colonel in the Territorial Force and appointed to command the 1st South Western Mounted Brigade; he was granted the temporary rank of brigadier-general on the outbreak of war in 1914. Shaftesbury served through the First World War from 1914 to 1918, and relinquished his appointment as a brigade commander on 1 March 1919, when he was granted the honorary rank of brigadier-general.

Political, civic and court offices
Lord Shaftesbury was Lord Lieutenant of Belfast from 1904 to 1911, Lord Lieutenant of Antrim from 1911 to 1916, and Lord Lieutenant of Dorset from 1916 to 1952. He was Lord Mayor of Belfast 1907, and Chancellor of Queen's University, Belfast 1909–1923.

At the Court, Lord Shaftesbury served as Chamberlain to Mary of Teck as Princess of Wales 1901–1910 and as Lord Chamberlain to her as Queen of the United Kingdom 1910–1922. That year he was appointed Lord Steward of the Household, serving until 1936.

Lord Shaftesbury served as President of the Salisbury Diocesan Guild of Ringers from 1919-1960, the year before his death.

Family life
On 15 July 1899, the 9th Earl of Shaftesbury married Lady Constance Sibell Grosvenor (22 August 1875 – 8 July 1957), the daughter of Victor Alexander Grosvenor, styled Earl Grosvenor (son and heir of Hugh Lupus Grosvenor, 1st Duke of Westminster) and his wife, Lady Sibell Mary Lumley, daughter of Richard George Lumley, 9th Earl of Scarbrough. Lady Constance was invested as a Dame of Justice of Order of St. John of Jerusalem (DJStJ) and served as a Lady and Extra Lady of the Bedchamber to Queen Mary.

The 9th Earl of Shaftesbury and his wife, Lady Constance had five children:

 Major Anthony Ashley-Cooper, Lord Ashley (4 October 1900 – 8 March 1947).
 Lady Mary Sibell Ashley-Cooper (3 October 1902 – 2 August 1936) was married to Napier Sturt, 3rd Baron Alington of Crichel.
 Lady Dorothea Louise Ashley-Cooper (29 April 1907 – 1987) was married to Anthony Head, 1st Viscount Head.
 Lady Lettice Mildred Ashley-Cooper (12 February 1911 – 1990) Flight Officer W.A.A.F ; European War 1939–45 (despatches).
 Major Anthony John Percy Hugh Michael Ashley-Cooper (5 October 1915 – 1986) was married to Julian Petherick, by whom he had four daughters. He was regarded by many to be one of the greatest salmon anglers of the 20th century and wrote four books on the subject.

Lord Ashley was heir apparent to the earldom, scheduled to inherit upon the death of his father. However, at age 46, Ashley died unexpectedly of heart disease before succession. At that time, his son, Anthony Ashley-Cooper, became heir apparent, inheriting the earldom in 1961 upon the death of his grandfather.

Philanthropy and community service

Bryanston School
In 1928, the 9th Earl provided a financial grant to establish a co-educational independent boarding school in Blandford, north Dorset, England, near the village of Bryanston. The 9th Earl served the school as the first Chairman of the Governors.

Bryanston School was founded by a young schoolmaster from Australia named J.G. Jeffreys. He used his confidence and enthusiasm to gain financial support for the school during a period of severe economic instability. With financial backing from the earl, he paid £35,000 for the Bryanston House and its  of immediate grounds.

The school occupies a palatial country house designed and built in 1889–1894 by Richard Norman Shaw and modelled on the chateau at Menars in the Loire valley. Shaw designed the house for Viscount Portman to replace an earlier one. The building and estate was the biggest in Dorset and the last of the grand stately homes to be built in England. The home had been occupied by the Portman family for 30 years at the time of its sale, however, death duties made it impossible for the 4th Lord Portman to hold on to his family estate.

There were just seven teachers and 23 boys of various ages in the first term. Jeffreys was a natural innovator but one who respected good traditions, reflected in his choice of the school motto, Et Nova Et Vetera. His was the first English school to adopt the Dalton Plan, its combination of the new and the old being of particular appeal. The system was flexible enough to offer a combination of lessons in the classroom and time for assignment work in subject rooms, which gave the students freedom to decide which pieces of academic work to focus their attention on. Students were required to keep a daily record on a chart showing their use of working and leisure time, meeting with their tutors on a weekly basis to ensure effective monitoring of their progress.

Bryanston is a member of the Headmasters' and Headmistresses' Conference and the Eton Group. It has a reputation as a liberal and artistic school. The principles of the Dalton Plan are still in place today and remain central to the school's success.

Belfast Castle
The 9th Earl of Shaftesbury presented Belfast Castle to the City of Belfast in 1934. In 1978, Belfast City Council began a major refurbishment over a period of ten years at a cost of over two million pounds. The architect was the Hewitt and Haslam Partnership. The building officially re-opened to the public on 11 November 1988.

Honours
1902: Provincial Grand Master of Freemasons in Dorset
1906: Knight of the Royal Victorian Order (KCVO)
1911: Knight of the Order of St Patrick (KP) (At his death, he was the last living non-royal member of the Order of St. Patrick.)
1919: Commander of the Order of the British Empire (CBE)
1920: Younger Brother of the Trinity House
1922: Privy Counsellor
1924: Knight Grand Cross of the Royal Victorian Order (GCVO)

Death and burial
The 9th Earl of Shaftesbury died in 1961 aged 91. He was buried in the Parish Church at Wimborne St Giles near the family estate. The earl's titles passed to his 22-year-old grandson, Anthony Ashley-Cooper.

The 9th Earl had carefully arranged financial matters on the Shaftesbury Estate so that his heirs would avoid death duties. When the earl died in 1961, his grandson inherited the family's 17th-century home and large estate in Dorset, several other properties and a collection of art, antiques, and other valuables. By the 1990s the 10th Earl's wealth was said to be in the "low millions".

References

External links
 

1869 births
1961 deaths
9
Knights of St Patrick
Knights Grand Cross of the Royal Victorian Order
Commanders of the Order of the British Empire
Lord Mayors of Belfast
Lord-Lieutenants of Dorset
Lord-Lieutenants of Antrim
Lord-Lieutenants of Belfast
10th Royal Hussars officers
North Irish Horse officers
Chancellors of Queen's University Belfast
Anthony
Members of the London School Board
British Army cavalry generals of World War I
Queen's Own Dorset Yeomanry officers
Members of the Privy Council of the United Kingdom
Members of Trinity House